The Imaichi Dam (今市ダム) is a concrete gravity dam on the Togawa River located  west of Nikkō in Tochigi Prefecture, Japan. 
The dam serves as the lower reservoir for the  Imaichi Pumped Storage Power Station, while the Kuriyama Dam forms the upper. 
It is owned by TEPCO and was constructed between 1979 and 1986. 
The reservoir can store  of water. Of that storage volume,  can be used for power generation.

Imaichi Pumped Storage Power Station
The power plant operates using the pumped storage hydroelectric method. During periods of high electricity demand, water is sent from the upper Kuriyama Reservoir to the power plant which contains 3 x  Francis pump turbines. Water discharged from the power plant then enters the Imaichi Reservoir. When demand is low, the pump-generators reverse mode and pump water from the lower reservoir back up to the upper. The process repeats as needed.

See also

 List of dams and reservoirs in Japan

References

Dams completed in 1986
Dams in Tochigi Prefecture
Gravity dams